Richard Arthur Tranter (1893–1957) was an English professional footballer who played for Burnley in the Football League as an inside forward.

Personal life 
Tranter served as a lance corporal in the King's Own (Royal Lancaster Regiment) during the First World War and received a gunshot wound to the head in February 1917. The wound led to his discharge from the army.

Career statistics

References 

Footballers from Bolton
English footballers
Burnley F.C. players
English Football League players
1893 births
1957 deaths
Association football inside forwards
Padiham F.C. players
King's Own Royal Regiment soldiers
British Army personnel of World War I
British shooting survivors
Military personnel from Lancashire